John Brake may refer to:

 John Brake (rugby union, born 1952), New Zealand rugby union player and coach
 John Brake (rugby union, born 1988), English rugby union and rugby sevens player